Trusetal is a former municipality in the district Schmalkalden-Meiningen, in Thuringia, Germany. Since 1 December 2011, it is part of the town Brotterode-Trusetal.

References

Former municipalities in Thuringia
Schmalkalden-Meiningen